José Alonso may refer to:

José Alonso (hurdler) (born 1957), Spanish athlete
José Alonso (actor) (born 1947), Mexican actor
José Alonso (sport shooter)
José Alonso (trade unionist) (1917–1970), Argentine trade-unionist
José María Alonso (1890–1979), Spanish tennis player
José Antonio Alonso (1960–2017), Spanish Socialist Workers' Party (PSOE) politician
José Ángel Alonso (born 1989), Spanish footballer